Pyridylnicotinamide may refer to one of two isomers with molecular formula C11H9N3O:

3-Pyridylnicotinamide
4-Pyridylnicotinamide